His Honour Thomas Oslaf Kellock QC (4 July 1923 – 12 January 1993), was a British Judge, Liberal Party politician and leading figure in the Anti-Apartheid Movement.

Background
He was the son of surgeon Thomas Herbert Kellock of Cambridge and Margaret Brooke. He was educated at Rugby School and Clare College, Cambridge. In 1967 he married Jane Ursula Symonds.

Professional career
He was barrister and a member of the chambers of former Liberal MP Dingle Foot.

Political career
He was elected a member of the Liberal Party council.
He was Liberal candidate for the Torquay division of Devon at the 1959 General Election. 
He was Chairman of the Anti-Apartheid Movement from 1963–65. He was Liberal candidate for the Kensington South division at the 1966 General Election. He was Liberal candidate for the Kensington South division at the 1968 Kensington South by-election. 
He was Liberal candidate for the Harwich division of Essex at the October 1974 General Election. He did not stand for parliament again. He was actively involved in Liberal International as Chairman of the British section.

Election results

See also
Anti-Apartheid Movement
Torquay (UK Parliament constituency)
Kensington South (UK Parliament constituency)
1968 Kensington South by-election
Harwich (UK Parliament constituency)
Liberal International

External links 
Kellock's page at the National Portrait Gallery:http://www.npg.org.uk/collections/search/person/mp81261/thomas-oslaf-kellock
Obituary, The Independent: https://www.independent.co.uk/news/people/obituary-his-honour-thomas-kellock-1470260.html

References

1923 births
1993 deaths
Liberal Party (UK) parliamentary candidates
Alumni of Clare College, Cambridge